Lebanon Springs Union Free School is a historic school building located at New Lebanon in Columbia County, New York.  It was built in 1913 and is a rectangular, two story, hipped roof brick building coated in stucco.  It sits on a tooled concrete foundation and is topped with a slate roof.  Atop the roof is an eight sided louvered belfry.  Also on the property are the remains of a railroad trestle over the Wyomanock Creek.

It was added to the National Register of Historic Places in 1991.

References

School buildings on the National Register of Historic Places in New York (state)
School buildings completed in 1913
Buildings and structures in Columbia County, New York
1913 establishments in New York (state)
National Register of Historic Places in Columbia County, New York